Journal of Comparative Physiology was a journal that split into Journal of Comparative Physiology A and Journal of Comparative Physiology B in 1984. It was the continuation of Zeitschrift für vergleichende Physiologie published from 1924 to 1972.

References

Physiology journals
Publications established in 1972
Publications disestablished in 1983
Springer Science+Business Media academic journals